Patricia Conroy (born January 30, 1964) is a Canadian singer-songwriter. In her career, she has released five studio albums, and one compilation album. She has also released 25 singles, including the RPM Country Tracks number one singles "Somebody's Leavin'" (1994) and "What Else Can I Do" (1995). As a songwriter, Conroy has written singles for several artists including Steel Magnolia ("Just By Being You (Halo and Wings)"), Emerson Drive ("She Always Gets What She Wants"), and Lady A ("Champagne Night").

Conroy was inducted into the Canadian Country Music Hall of Fame in 2021.

Biography

Early life
Patricia Conroy was born on January 30, 1964, in Montreal, Quebec, Canada. Conroy was born to musical family which was influenced by her mother's Maritime country background and her father's Irish roots. As a young girl her musical interests led to piano and vocal lessons and performances in a local church and with her family band, the Shamrock Ceili Band. In the late 1980s, Conroy hooked up with local musicians in Vancouver, British Columbia and eventually entered a Battle of the Bands contest. Conroy ultimately won and received $10,000, which gave her the opportunity to record demos of some of her original material. By 1990, Conroy was approached by executives at Warner Music Canada, who signed her to a recording contract.

Career
Her first album for the label, Blue Angel, was released later the same year. Two singles from the album, "This Time" and "Take Me With You", both reached the top 10 in Canada.

Conroy's second album, Bad Day for Trains, was released in 1992. It contained four top 10s, including "Bad Day for Trains", "What Do You Care", "Blank Pages" and "My Baby Loves Me (Just the Way That I Am)", later recorded by Martina McBride.

Her most successful album to date, You Can't Resist, was released in 1994. The first two songs released from the album, "Somebody's Leavin'" and "What Else Can I Do", both reached No. 1. Follow-up singles "You Can't Resist It", "I Don't Wanna Be the One" and "Keep Me Rockin'" all reached the top 10.

Conroy signed with Shoreline Records in 1998 for the release of her fourth album, Wild As the Wind. She continued her streak of hits with the songs "Direction Of Love" and "Ain't Nobody Like You". Her Greatest Hits album was released two years later, along with the top 40 song "Nobody's Fault".

In 2005, Conroy returned with her new video, "When", which was the first single off her new album. In 2007, Conroy signed with 306 Records/Angeline Entertainment for the release of her first full-length studio album in 9 years, Talking to Myself. Three singles have been released from the album so far, "When", "Talking to Myself" and "Ray of Sun."

In a statement made on her official website in June 2008, Conroy announced that she was taking time to write songs for Lisa Brokop, Jimmy Rankin, Chad Brownlee and Michelle Wright for their upcoming projects. She has songwriting credits on The Rankin Family's album, These Are the Moments, released February 3, 2009. "Just By Being You (Halo and Wings)", a song co-written by Conroy, was released by American country duo Steel Magnolia in 2010. Emerson Drive recorded Conroy's "She Always Get What She Wants" for their 2012 album Roll and released it as the album's fourth single in June 2013.

In 2020, Conroy co-wrote the song "Champagne Night", which was featured on the NBC songwriting competition series Songland and recorded by Lady A. The song reached number one on the Billboard Country Airplay chart in January 2021.

Discography

Studio albums

Compilation albums

Singles

Music videos

Awards

Canadian Country Music Awards
Vista Rising Star (1990)
Album of the Year, Bad Day for Trains (1993)
Female Artist of the Year (1994)
Independent Artist of the Year (1999, 2000)
Independent Female Artist of the Year (2006)
Songwriter of the Year (2021)
Canadian Country Music Hall of Fame (2021)

British Columbia Country Music Awards
Ray McAuley Horizon Award (1988)
Female Vocalist of the Year (1988, 1989, 1990, 1991)
Entertainer of the Year (1989, 1991, 1993, 1994)
Album of the Year, Blue Angel (1991)
Song of the Year, "Bad Day for Trains" (1993)
Single of the Year, "Bad Day for Trains" (1993)
Album of the Year, Bad Day for Trains (1993)
Song of the Year, "Blank Pages" (1994)
International Achievement (1997)

References

External links
Official site
 

Singers from Montreal
Canadian women country singers
Canadian country singer-songwriters
Living people
Anglophone Quebec people
Canadian Country Music Association Female Artist of the Year winners
Canadian Country Music Association Rising Star Award winners
Canadian Country Music Association Album of the Year winners
1964 births